is Yukari Tamura's tenth single, released on August 2, 2006. Dōwa Meikyū is the first opening theme song for the  TV series. The B-sides, miss you and Tenshi no Oshigoto were opening and ending theme songs respectively for Yukari's radio show, .

Track listing
 
 Lyrics: Aki Hata
 Arrangement and composition: Masatomo Ota
 miss you
 Lyrics, arrangement and composition: Hayato Tanaka
 
 Lyrics: Manami Fujino
 Arrangement and composition: tetsu-yeah

References 

Yukari Tamura songs
2006 singles
2006 songs